A phone connector, also known as phone jack, audio jack, headphone jack or jack plug, is a family of electrical connectors typically used for analog audio signals. A plug, the male connector, is inserted into the jack, the female connector.

The phone connector was invented for use in telephone switchboards in the 19th century and is still widely used.

The phone connector is cylindrical in shape, with a grooved tip to retain it. In its original audio configuration, it typically has two, three, four or, occasionally, five contacts. Three-contact versions are known as TRS connectors (tip, ring, sleeve). Ring contacts are typically the same diameter as the sleeve, the long shank. Similarly, two-, four- and five-contact versions are called TS, TRRS and TRRRS connectors respectively.

Other terms 
Specific models, and connectors used in specific applications, may be termed e.g. stereo plug, headphone jack, microphone jack, aux input, etc. The 3.5 mm versions are mini-phone, mini-stereo, mini jack, etc.

In the UK, jack plug and jack socket are the male and female phone connectors. In the US, a stationary (more fixed) electrical connector is the jack. The terms phone plug and phone jack sometimes refer to different genders of phone connectors, but also sometimes refer to the RJ11 and older telephone plugs and corresponding jacks that connect wired telephones to wall outlets.

Phone plugs and jacks are different from phono plugs and phono jacks (or in the UK, phono socket) which are RCA connectors common in consumer hi-fi and audiovisual equipment. The 3.5 mm connector is, however, sometimes—but counter to the connector manufacturers' nomenclature—referred to as mini phono.

Historical development

Quarter-inch size 
Modern phone connectors are available in three standard sizes. The original  version descends from as early as 1877, when the first-ever telephone switchboard was installed at 109 Court Street in Boston in a building owned by Charles Williams, Jr.; or 1878, when an early switchboard was used for the first commercial manual telephone exchange in New Haven, Connecticut created by George W. Coy. The 1877 switchboard was last known to be located in the lobby of 185 Franklin Street, Boston.

In February 1884, C. E. Scribner was issued US Patent 293,198 for a "jack-knife" connector that is the origin of calling the receptacle a "jack". Scribner was issued U.S. Patents 262,701, 305,021, and 489,570 relating to an improved design that more closely resembles the modern plug. The current form of the switchboard-plug was patented prior to 1902, when Henry P. Clausen received a patent on an improved design. It is today still used on mainstream musical equipment, especially on electric guitars.

Western Electric was the manufacturing arm of the Bell System, and thus originated or refined most of the engineering designs, including the telephone jacks and plugs which were later adopted by other industries, including the U.S. military.

By 1907, Western Electric had designed a number of models for different purposes, including:

 Code No. 47 2-conductor plugs for use with type 3, 91, 99, 102, 103, 108, and 124 jacks—used for switchboards
 Code No. 85 3-conductor plugs for use with type 77 jacks—used for the operator's head telephone
 Code No. 103 twin 2-conductor plugs for use with type 91, and type 99 jacks—used for the operator's head telephone and chest transmitter (microphone)
 Code No. 109 3-conductor plugs for use with jack 92 on telephone switchboards (with the same basic shape as the modern Bantam plugs)
 Code No. 110, 3-conductor plug for use with jacks 49, 117, 118, 140, and 141 on switchboards
 Code No. 112, twin 2-conductor plug for use with jacks 91 and 99—used for the operator's head telephone and chest, with a transmitter cutout key (microphone mute)
 Code No. 116, 1-conductor plug for use with cordless jack boxes
 Code No. 126, 3-conductor plug for use with type 132 and type 309 jacks on portable street railway sets

By 1950, the two main plug designs were:

 WE-309 (compatible with -inch jacks, such as 246 jack), for use on high-density jack panels such as the 608A
 WE-310 (compatible with -inch jacks, such as the 242)

Several modern designs have descended from those earlier versions:

 B-Gauge standard BPO316 (not compatible with EIA RS-453)
 EIA RS-453: Dimensional, Mechanical and Electrical Characteristics Defining Phone Plugs & Jacks standard of  diameter, also found in IEC 60603-11:1992 Connectors for frequencies below 3 MHz for use with printed boards – Part 11: Detail specification for concentric connectors (dimensions for free connectors and fixed connectors).

Military variants 
U.S. military versions of the Western Electric plugs were initially specified in Amendment No.1, MIL-P-642, and included:

 M642/1-1
 M642/1-2
 M642/2-1
 M642/2-2
 M642/4-1
 M642/4-2
 MIL-P-642/2, also known as PJ-051. (Similar to Western Electric WE-310, and thus not compatible with EIA RS-453)
 MIL-P-642/5A: Plug, Telephone (TYPE PJ-068) and Accessory Screws (1973), and MIL-DTL-642F: Plugs, Telephone, and Accessory Screws (2015), with  diameter, also known by the earlier Signal Corps PL-68 designation. These are commonly used as the microphone jack for aviation radios, and on Collins S-line and many Drake amateur radios. MIL-DTL-642F states, "This specification covers telephone plugs used in telephone (including telephone switchboard consoles), telegraph, and teletype circuits, and for connecting headsets, handsets, and microphones into communications circuits."

Miniature size 
The 3.5 mm or miniature size was originally designed in the 1950s as two-conductor connectors for earpieces on transistor radios, and remains a standard still used today. This roughly half-sized version of the original, popularized by the Sony EFM-117J radio (released in 1964), is still commonly used in portable applications. The three-conductor version became very popular with its application on the Walkman in 1979, as unlike earlier transistor radios, these devices had no speaker of their own; the usual way to listen to them was to plug in headphones. There is also an EIA standard for 0.141-inch miniature phone jacks.

The 2.5 mm or sub-miniature sizes were similarly popularized on small portable electronics. They often appeared next to a 3.5 mm microphone jack for a remote control on-off switch on early portable tape recorders; the microphone provided with such machines had the on-off switch and used a two-pronged connector with both the 3.5 and 2.5 mm plugs. They were also used for low-voltage DC power input from wall adapters. In the latter role they were soon replaced by coaxial DC power connectors. 2.5 mm phone jacks have also been used as the headset jacks on mobile telephones (see ).

The 3.5 mm and 2.5 mm sizes are sometimes called  in and  in respectively in the United States, though those dimensions are only approximations. All sizes are now readily available in two-conductor (unbalanced mono) and three-conductor (balanced mono or unbalanced stereo) versions.

Four-conductor versions of the 3.5 mm plug and jack are used for certain applications. A four-conductor version is often used in compact camcorders and portable media players, providing stereo sound and composite analog video. It is also used for a combination of stereo audio, a microphone, and controlling media playback, calls, volume and/or a virtual assistant on some laptop computers and most mobile phones, and some handheld amateur radio transceivers from Yaesu. Some headphone amplifiers have used it to connect "balanced" stereo headphones, which require two conductors per audio channel as the channels do not share a common ground.

Broadcast usage 
By the 1940s, broadcast radio stations were using Western Electric Code No. 103 plugs and matching jacks for patching audio throughout studios. This connector was used because of its use in AT&T's Long Line circuits for distribution of audio programs over the radio networks' leased telephone lines. Because of the large amount of space these patch panels required, the industry began switching to 3-conductor plugs and jacks in the late 1940s, using the WE Type 291 plug with WE type 239 jacks. The type 291 plug was used instead of the standard type 110 switchboard plug because the location of the large bulb shape on this TRS plug would have resulted in both audio signal connections being shorted together for a brief moment while the plug is being inserted and removed. The Type 291 plug avoids this by having a shorter tip.

Patch bay connectors 
Professional audio and the telecommunication industry use a  diameter plug, associated with trademarked names including Bantam, TT, Tini-Telephone, and Tini-Tel. They are not compatible with standard EIA RS-453/IEC 60603-11 1/4-inch jacks. In addition to a slightly smaller diameter, they have a slightly different geometry. The three-conductor TRS versions are capable of handling balanced line signals and are used in professional audio installations. Though unable to handle as much power, and less reliable than a  jack, Bantam connectors are used for professional console and outboard patchbays in recording studio and live sound applications, where large numbers of patch points are needed in a limited space. The slightly different shape of Bantam plugs is also less likely to cause shorting as they are plugged in.

Less common 

The socket versions of these can be used with normal phone plugs provided the plug bodies are not too large, but the plug version will only mate with two sockets at  inches centre spacing, or with line sockets, again with sufficiently small bodies. These connectors are still used today in telephone company central offices on "DSX" patch panels for DS1 circuits. A similar type of 3.5 mm connector is often used in the armrests of older aircraft, as part of the on-board in-flight entertainment system. Plugging a stereo plug into one of the two mono jacks typically results in the audio coming into only one ear. Adapters are available.

A short-barrelled version of the phone plug was used for 20th century high-impedance mono headphones, and in particular those used in World War II aircraft. These have become rare. It is physically possible to use a normal plug in a short socket, but a short plug will neither lock into a normal socket nor complete the tip circuit.

Less commonly used sizes, both diameters and lengths, are also available from some manufacturers, and are used when it is desired to restrict the availability of matching connectors, such as  inside diameter jacks for fire safety communication in public buildings.

Aviation and US military connectors 

The US military uses a variety of phone connectors including -inch (0.281 inch, 7.14 mm) and -inch (0.25 inch, 6.35 mm) diameter plugs.

Commercial and general aviation (GA) civil aircraft headsets often use a pair of phone connectors. A standard -inch (6.3 mm) 2 or 3-conductor plug, type PJ-055, is used for headphones. For the microphone, a smaller -inch (0.206 inch / 5.23 mm) diameter 3-conductor plug, type PJ-068, is used.

Military aircraft and civil helicopters have another type termed the U-174/U (Nexus TP-101), also known as U-93A/U (Nexus TP-102) and Nexus TP-120. These are also known as US NATO plugs. These have a  diameter shaft with four conductors, allowing two for the headphones, and two for the microphone. Also used is the U-384/U (Nexus TP-105), which has the same diameter as the U-174/U but is slightly longer and has 5 conductors instead of 4.

There is a confusingly similar four-conductor British connector, Type 671 (10H/18575), with a slightly larger diameter of  used for headsets in many UK military aircraft and often referred to as a UK NATO or European NATO connector.

Mono and stereo compatibility 

The original application for the 6.35 mm ( in) phone jack was in manual telephone exchanges. Many different configurations of these phone plugs were used, some accommodating five or more conductors, with several tip profiles. Of these many varieties, only the two-conductor version with a rounded tip profile was compatible between different manufacturers, and this was the design that was at first adopted for use with microphones, electric guitars, headphones, loudspeakers, and other audio equipment.

When a three-conductor version of the 6.35 mm plug was introduced for use with stereo headphones, it was given a sharper tip profile in order to make it possible to manufacture jacks that would accept only stereo plugs, to avoid short-circuiting the right channel of the amplifier. This attempt has long been abandoned, and now the convention is that all plugs fit all sockets of the same size, regardless of whether they are balanced or unbalanced, mono or stereo. Most 6.35 mm plugs, mono or stereo, now have the profile of the original stereo plug, although a few rounded mono plugs are still produced. The profiles of stereo miniature and sub-miniature plugs have always been identical to the mono plugs of the same size.

The results of this physical compatibility are:

If a two-conductor plug is inserted into a three-conductor socket, the result is that the ring (right channel) of the socket is grounded. This property is deliberately used in several applications. However, if equipment is not designed for such a use, grounding the right channel causes a short circuit which has the potential to damage an audio amplifier channel. In any case, any signal from the right channel is naturally lost in this scenario.
If a three-conductor plug is connected to a two-conductor socket, normally the result is to leave the ring of the plug unconnected. This open circuit is potentially dangerous to equipment utilizing vacuum tubes, but most solid-state devices will tolerate an open condition well. A three-conductor socket could be wired as an unbalanced mono socket to ground the ring in this situation, but the more conventional wiring is to leave the ring unconnected, exactly simulating a mono socket.

Because of a lack of standardization in the past regarding the dimensions (length) given to the ring conductor and the insulating portions on either side of it in 6.35 mm ( in) phone connectors and the width of the conductors in different brands and generations of sockets, there are occasional issues with compatibility between differing brands of plug and socket. This can result in a contact in the socket bridging (shorting) the ring and sleeve contacts on a phone connector.

General use 

In the most common arrangement, consistent with the original intention of the design, the male plug is connected to a cable, and the female socket is mounted in a piece of equipment. A considerable variety of line plugs and panel sockets is available, including plugs suiting various cable sizes, right-angle plugs, and both plugs and sockets in a variety of price ranges and with current capacities up to 15 amperes for certain heavy-duty  in versions intended for loudspeaker connections.

Common uses of phone plugs and their matching sockets include:

Headphone and earphone jacks on a wide range of equipment. 6.35 mm ( in) plugs are common on home and professional component equipment, while 3.5 mm plugs are nearly universal for portable audio equipment and headphones. 2.5 mm plugs are not as common, but are used on communication equipment such as cordless phones, mobile phones, and two-way radios, especially in the earliest years of the 21st century before the 3.5 mm became standard on mobile phones. The use of headphone jacks in smartphones is declining  in favor of USB-C connectors and wireless Bluetooth solutions.
 Consumer electronics devices such as digital cameras, camcorders, and portable DVD players use 3.5 mm connectors for composite video and audio output. Typically, a TRS connection is used for mono unbalanced audio plus video, and a TRRS connection for stereo unbalanced audio plus video. Cables designed for this use are often terminated with RCA connectors on the other end. Sony also used this style of connection as the TV-Out on some models of Vaio laptop.
 Hands-free sets and headsets often use 3.5 mm or 2.5 mm connectors. TRS connectors are used for mono audio out and an unbalanced microphone (with a shared ground). Four-conductor TRRS phone connectors add an additional audio channel for stereo output. TRRS connectors used for this purpose are sometimes interoperable with TRS connectors, depending on how the contacts are used.
Microphone inputs on tape and cassette recorders, sometimes with remote control switching on the ring, on early, monaural cassette recorders mostly a dual-pin version consisting of a 3.5 mm TS for the microphone and a 2.5 mm TS for remote control which switches the recorder's power supply.
Patching points (insert points) on a wide range of equipment.

Computer sound 

Personal computer sound cards, such as Creative Labs' Sound Blaster line, use a 3.5 mm phone connector as a mono microphone input, and deliver a 5 V bias voltage on the ring to power the FET preamplifier built into electret microphones. Adjustments may be required to achieve compatibility between different manufacturers.

The Apple PlainTalk microphone jack used on some older Macintosh systems is designed to accept an extended 3.5 mm three-conductor phone connector; in this case, the tip carries power for a preamplifier inside the microphone. It cannot accept a standard microphone without a preamp. If a PlainTalk-compatible microphone is not available, the jack can accept a line-level sound input.

Normally, 3.5 mm three-conductor sockets are used in computer sound cards for stereo output. Thus, for a sound card with 5.1 output, there will be three sockets to accommodate six channels: front left and right; surround left and right; and center and subwoofer. 6.1 and 7.1 channel sound cards from Creative Labs, however, use a single three-conductor socket (for the front speakers) and two four-conductor sockets. This is to accommodate rear-center (6.1) or rear left and right (7.1) channels without the need for additional sockets on the sound card.

Some portable computers have a combined 3.5 mm TRS-TOSLINK jack, supporting stereo audio output using a TRS connector, or TOSLINK (stereo or 5.1 Dolby Digital/DTS) digital output using a suitable optical adapter. Most iMac computers have this digital/analog combo output feature as standard, with early MacBooks having two ports, one for analog/digital audio input and other for output. Support for input was dropped on various later models

Some newer computers, such as Lenovo laptops, have 3.5 mm TRRS headset sockets, which are compatible with phone headsets and may be distinguished by a headset icon instead of the usual headphones or microphone icons. These are particularly used for voice over IP.

Video 

Equipment requiring video with stereo audio input or output sometimes uses 3.5 mm TRRS connectors.

Attempting to fully insert the longer (17 mm) plug into a receptacle designed for the shorter (15 mm) plug may damage the receptacle, and may damage any electronics located immediately behind the receptacle. However, partially inserting the plug will work as the tip/ring/ring distances are the same for both variants.

A shorter plug in a socket designed for the longer connector may not be retained firmly and may result in wrong signal routing or a short circuit inside the equipment (e.g. the plug tip may cause the contacts inside the receptacle – tip/ring 1, etc. - to short together).

The shorter 15 mm TRRS variant is more common and physically compatible with standard 3.5 mm TRS and TS connectors.

Recording equipment 

Many small video cameras, laptops, recorders and other consumer devices use a 3.5 mm microphone connector for attaching a microphone to the system. These fall into three categories:
 Devices that use an unpowered microphone: usually a cheap dynamic or piezoelectric microphone. The microphone generates its own voltage and needs no power.
 Devices that use a self-powered microphone: usually a condenser microphone with an internal battery-powered amplifier.
 Devices that use a plug-in powered microphone: an electret microphone containing an internal FET amplifier. These provide a good quality signal, in a very small microphone. However, the internal FET needs a DC power supply, which is provided as a bias voltage for an internal preamp transistor. Plug-in power is supplied on the same line as the audio signal, using an RC filter. The DC bias voltage supplies the FET amplifier (at a low current), while the capacitor decouples the DC supply from the AC input to the recorder. Typically, V=1.5 V, R=1 kΩ, C=47 μF. If a recorder provides plug-in power, and the microphone does not need it, everything will usually work well. In the converse case (recorder provides no power; microphone needs power), no sound will be recorded.

PDAs and mobile phones 

Three- or four-conductor (TRS or TRRS) 2.5 mm and 3.5 mm sockets are common on older cell phones and newer smartphones respectively, providing mono (three conductor) or stereo (four conductor) sound and a microphone input, together with signaling (e.g., push a button to answer a call). These are used both for handsfree headsets and for stereo headphones.

3.5 mm TRRS (stereo-plus-mic) sockets became particularly common on smartphones, and have been used e.g. by Nokia since 2006; they are often compatible with standard 3.5 mm stereo headphones. Some computers now also include a TRRS headset socket, compatible with the headsets intended for smartphones.

The four conductors of a TRRS connector are assigned to different purposes by different manufacturers. Any 3.5 mm plug can be plugged mechanically into any socket, but many combinations are electrically incompatible. For example, plugging TRRS headphones into a TRS headset socket, TRS headset into a TRRS socket, or plugging TRRS headphones from one manufacturer into a TRRS socket from another may not function correctly, or at all. Mono audio will usually work, but stereo audio or the microphone may not work.

TRRS standards 
Two different forms are frequently found, both of which place left audio on the tip and right audio on the first ring (for compatibility with stereo connectors). Where they differ is in the placement of the microphone and return contacts.

The first, which places the ground return on the sleeve and the microphone on the second ring, is standardized in OMTP and has been accepted as a national Chinese standard YDT 1885–2009.  It is mostly used on older devices, such as older Nokia mobiles, older Samsung smartphones, and some Sony Ericsson phones, and products meant for the Chinese market. Headsets using this wiring may be indicated by black plastic separators between the rings.

The second, which reverses these contacts, with the microphone on the sleeve, is used by Apple's iPhone line until the 6S and SE (1st), and has become the de facto TRRS standard, to maintain compatibility with these products. It is now used by HTC devices, recent Samsung, Nokia, and Sony phones, among others. This is referred to as CTIA/AHJ, and has the disadvantage that the mic will be shorted to ground if the body of the device is metal, and the sleeve has a flange that contacts it.  Headsets using this wiring may be indicated by white plastic separators between the rings.

If a CTIA headset is connected to a mobile phone with OMTP interface, the missing ground will effectively connect speakers in out-of-phase series, resulting in no voice on typical popular music recordings where the singers are in the center; in this case, if the main microphone button is held down, shorting across the microphone and restoring ground, the correct sound may be audible.

The 4-pole 3.5 mm connector is defined by the Japanese standard JEITA/EIAJ RC-5325A, "4-Pole miniature concentric plugs and jacks", originally published in 1993. 3-pole 3.5 mm TRS connectors are defined in JIS C 6560. See also JIS C 5401 and IEC 60130-8.

Interoperability
The USB Type-C Cable and Connector Specification specifies a mapping from a USB-C jack to a 4-pole TRRS jack, for the use of headsets, and supports both CTIA and OMTP (YD/T 1885–2009) modes. Some devices transparently handle many jack standards, and there are hardware implementations of this available as components. This is accomplished in some cases by applying a voltage to the sleeve and second ring to detect the wiring. The last two conductors may then be switches to allow a device made to one standard to be used with a headset made to the other.

TRRRS standards 
A TRRRS standard for 3.5 mm connectors was developed by ITU-T. The standard, called P.382 (formerly P.MMIC), outlines technical requirements and test methods for a 5-conductor socket and plug configuration. Compared to the TRRS standard, TRRRS provides one extra conductor that can be used for connecting a second microphone or providing power to or from the audio accessory.

P.382 requires compliant sockets and plugs to be backward compatible with legacy TRRS and TRS connectors. Therefore, P.382-compliant TRRRS connectors should allow for seamless integration when used on new products. TRRRS connectors enable the following audio applications: active noise canceling, binaural recording and others, where dual analog microphone lines can be directly connected to a host device. It was commonly found on Sony phones starting with the Xperia Z1-XZ1 and Xperia 1 II.

Another TRRRS standard for 4.4 mm connectors following JEITA RC-8141C was introduced in 2015 and is used for balanced audio connections, in particular for headphone cables. This connector is often called a Pentaconn connector following the brand name of Nippon DICS (NDICS). It is used by some Sony products like the M1Z Walkman of their Signature series and by some Sennheiser products like the HD 820 headphone or the HDC 820 DAC headphone amplifier.

Switch contacts 

Panel-mounted jacks may include switch contacts. Most commonly, a mono jack is provided with one normally closed (NC) contact, which is connected to the tip (live) connection when no plug is in the socket, and disconnected when a plug is inserted. Stereo sockets commonly provide two such NC contacts, one for the tip (left channel) and one for the ring or collar (right channel). Some jacks also have such a connection on the sleeve. As this contact is usually ground, it is not much use for signal switching, but could be used to indicate to electronic circuitry that the jack is in use. Less commonly, jacks may feature normally open (NO) or change-over contacts or the switch contacts may be isolated from the connector signals.

The original purpose of these contacts was for switching in telephone exchanges, for which there were many patterns. Two sets of change-over contacts, isolated from the connector contacts, were common. The more recent pattern of one NC contact for each signal path, internally attached to the connector contact, stems from their use as headphone jacks. In many amplifiers and equipment containing them, such as electronic organs, a headphone jack is provided that disconnects the loudspeakers when in use. This is done by means of these switch contacts. In other equipment, a dummy load is provided when the headphones are not connected. This is also easily provided by means of these NC contacts.

Other uses for these contacts have been found. One is to interrupt a signal path to enable other circuitry to be inserted. This is done by using one NC contact of a stereo jack to connect the tip and ring together when no plug is inserted. The tip is then made the output, and the ring the input (or vice versa), thus forming a patch point.

Another use is to provide alternative mono or stereo output facilities on some guitars and electronic organs. This is achieved by using two mono jacks, one for left channel and one for right, and wiring the NC contact on the right channel jack to the tip of the other, to connect the two connector tips together when the right channel output is not in use. This then mixes the signals so that the left channel jack doubles as a mono output.

Where a 3.5 mm or 2.5 mm jack is used as a DC power inlet connector, a switch contact may be used to disconnect an internal battery whenever an external power supply is connected, to prevent incorrect recharging of the battery.

A standard stereo jack is used on most battery-powered guitar effects pedals to eliminate the need for a separate power switch. In this configuration, the internal battery has its negative terminal wired to the sleeve contact of the jack. When the user plugs in a two-conductor (mono) guitar or microphone lead, the resulting short circuit between sleeve and ring connects an internal battery to the unit's circuitry, ensuring that it powers up or down automatically whenever a signal lead is inserted or removed. A drawback of this design is the risk of inadvertently discharging the battery if the lead is not removed after use, such as if the equipment is left plugged in overnight.

Design 

The connector assembly is usually made by few hollow and one solid pins. The jack is then assembled together by using an electric insulator material (such as plastics e.g. POM) into a single piece in such a way that pins don't short circuit. 

 Notes

Balanced audio 

When a phone connector is used to make a balanced connection, the two active conductors are both used for a monaural signal. The ring, used for the right channel in stereo systems, is used instead for the inverting input. This is a common use in small audio mixing desks, where space is a premium and they offer a more compact alternative to XLR connectors. Another advantage offered by TRS phone connectors used for balanced microphone inputs is that a standard unbalanced signal lead using a TS phone jack can simply be plugged into such an input. The ring (right channel) contact then makes contact with the plug body, correctly grounding the inverting input.

A disadvantage of using phone connectors for balanced audio connections is that the ground mates last and the socket grounds the plug tip and ring when inserting or disconnecting the plug. This causes bursts of hum, cracks and pops and may stress some outputs as they will be short circuited briefly, or longer if the plug is left half in.

This problem does not occur when using the 'gauge B' (BPO) phone connector (PO 316) which although it is of 0.25 in (6.35 mm) diameter has a smaller tip and a recessed ring so that the ground contact of the socket never touches the tip or ring of the plug. This type was designed for balanced audio use, being the original telephone 'switchboard' connector and is still common in broadcast, telecommunications and many professional audio applications where it is vital that permanent circuits being monitored (bridged) are not interrupted by the insertion or removal of connectors. This same tapered shape used in the 'gauge B' (BPO) plug can be seen also in aviation and military applications on various diameters of jack connector including the PJ-068 and 'bantam' plugs. The more common straight-sided profile used in domestic and commercial applications and discussed in most of this article is known as 'gauge A'.

XLR connectors used in much professional audio equipment mate the ground signal on pin 1 first.

Unbalanced audio 

Phone connectors with three conductors are also commonly used as unbalanced audio patch points (or insert points, or simply inserts), with the output on many mixers found on the tip (left channel) and the input on the ring (right channel). This is often expressed as "tip send, ring return". Other mixers have unbalanced insert points with "ring send, tip return". One advantage of this system is that the switch contact within the panel socket, originally designed for other purposes, can be used to close the circuit when the patch point is not in use. An advantage of the tip send patch point is that if it is used as an output only, a 2-conductor mono phone plug correctly grounds the input. In the same fashion, use of a "tip return" insert style allows a mono phone plug to bring an unbalanced signal directly into the circuit, though in this case the output must be robust enough to withstand being grounded. Combining send and return functions via single  in TRS connectors in this way is seen in very many professional and semi-professional audio mixing desks, because it halves the space needed for insert jack fields which would otherwise need two jacks, one for send and one for return. The tradeoff is that unbalanced signals are more prone to buzz, hum and outside interference.

In some three-conductor TRS phone inserts, the concept is extended by using specially designed phone jacks that will accept a mono phone plug partly inserted to the first click and will then connect the tip to the signal path without breaking it. Most standard phone connectors can also be used in this way with varying success, but neither the switch contact nor the tip contact can be relied upon unless the internal contacts have been designed with extra strength for holding the plug tip in place. Even with stronger contacts, an accidental mechanical movement of the inserted plug can interrupt signal within the circuit. For maximum reliability, any usage involving first click or half-click positions will instead rewire the plug to short tip and ring together and then insert this modified plug all the way into the jack.

The TRS tip return, ring send unbalanced insert configuration is mostly found on older mixers. This allowed for the insert jack to serve as a standard-wired mono line input that would bypass the mic preamp. However tip send has become the generally accepted standard for mixer inserts since the early-to-mid 1990s. The TRS ring send configuration is still found on some compressor sidechain input jacks such as the dbx 166XL.

In some very compact equipment, 3.5 mm TRS phone connectors are used as patch points.

Some sound recording devices use a three-conductor phone connector as a mono microphone input, using the tip as the signal path and the ring to connect a standby switch on the microphone.

Poor connections 

Connectors that are tarnished, or that were not manufactured within tight tolerances, are prone to cause poor connections. Depending upon the surface material of the connectors, tarnished ones can be cleaned with a burnishing agent (for solid brass contacts typical) or contact cleaner (for plated contacts).

See also 

Banana connector
Coaxial power connector

Explanatory notes

References

External links 

 The 19th Century plug that's still being used—BBC News
 

Audio engineering
Audiovisual connectors
Computer connectors
Telephone connectors